Stitch Fix is an online personal styling service in the United States and United Kingdom. It uses recommendation algorithms and data science to personalize clothing items based on size, budget and style. The company was founded in 2011 and had an initial public offering in 2017 with a valuation of $1.6 billion. Stitch Fix generated more than $1 billion in sales during 2018 and reported 3.4 million customers in June 2020. It is headquartered in San Francisco, California and employs 8,000 people worldwide.

History

Stitch Fix was founded in 2011 by Katrina Lake and former J.Crew buyer Erin Morrison Flynn. The business was originally called Rack Habit, and was initially run out of Lake's apartment in Cambridge, Massachusetts. The company began by catering only to women, but it has subsequently expanded to men's clothing, plus sizes, maternity wear, and kids.

In 2014, Stitch Fix started to be profitable. In July 2016, the company ended its fiscal year with recorded sales of $730 million, and in May 2017, the company had raised $42 million from outside investors.

In November 2017, the company went public on Nasdaq. It was the first female-led company to launch an IPO in over a year.

In October 2018, several class action lawsuits were brought against Stitch Fix alleging that the company had violated federal securities laws by making misleading statements about its growth prospects.

As of 2019, the company had 8,000 employees including 5,100 stylists and more than 100 data scientists.

On June 2, 2020, the company announced layoffs for 1,400 employees, which was 18% of its total workforce, all of whom were remote workers in California. The affected employees were given the option of remaining with the company if they relocated. The online retailer also announced it would hire roughly 2,000 stylists in cities that have a lower cost of living than those in California, such as Austin, Cleveland, Dallas, Minneapolis, and Pittsburgh.

In August 2021, Elizabeth Spaulding replaced founder Katrina Lake as CEO. In January 2023, Spaulding stepped down as CEO, and Lake returned as interim CEO.

Service 
Stitch Fix is a personal styling service that sends individually picked clothing and accessories items for a one-time styling fee. Customers fill out a survey online about their style preferences. A stylist at the company picks five items to send to the customer. Stylists pick items based on a customer's survey answers and any access the customer gives them to their social media outlets. The customer schedules a date to receive their items, which is referred to as a "Fix". Once the shipment is received, the customer has three days to choose to keep the items or return some or all of them. If the customer keeps at least one item, the initial styling fee is credited towards the cost of the item. In addition to the styling fee being credited, if the customer decides to keep all five items, the customer receives 25% off the total cost of the items. Customers choose the shipping frequency, such as every two weeks, once a month, or every two months. The company also supports integration with Pinterest boards, allowing customers to add photos of fashion looks that they like. These boards may be viewed by a Stitch Fix stylist.

The company uses data science and has combined personal stylists and machine learning (AI) for personalized recommendation.

Media

Stitch Fix was referenced in a Wired article about recommendation algorithms, data science and astrophysics in Silicon Valley. Wired also highlighted a new feature known as "Shop Your Looks," which suggests items matched to those previously purchased by customers. Fast Company profiled the company and called attention to "its data prowess across every aspect of its business to reinvent the $334 billion U.S. apparel industry." It was recognized as one of the "50 Most Innovative Companies" for 2019. Stitch Fix hosted a Golden Globes-like red carpet event in the 59th Street–Columbus Circle station in New York City and had a 60-second spot before the 2019 Academy Awards.

References

External links

American companies established in 2011
Retail companies established in 2011
Internet properties established in 2011
Non-store retailing
Retail companies of the United States
Companies based in San Francisco
Companies listed on the Nasdaq
2017 initial public offerings
Subscription services